The People's Alliance was an electoral alliance in Iceland from 1956 to 1968 and a socialist political party from 1968 to 1998.

History 
In 1916, the Social Democratic Party (Alþýðuflokkurinn) was formed in Iceland. In 1930 the party split, leading to the formation of the Communist Party of Iceland (Kommúnistaflokkur Íslands), recognised as the Icelandic section of the Communist International. In 1937 the social democrats suffered another split, and the splintergroup unified itself with the communists forming the Socialist Party (Sósíalistaflokkurinn). However, the new party did not become a ComIntern member as its forerunner.

On April 4, 1956 the Socialist Party created an electoral alliance with yet another left-wing split of the Social Democratic Party led by Hannibal Valdimarsson, thus forming the People's Alliance with Hannibal as its chairman.

In 1963 National Preservation Party (Þjóðvarnarflokkurinn) contributed people to the joint electoral alliance, resulting in Gils Guðmundsson, a former member of parliament (1953–1956) for Þjóðvarnarflokkurinn gaining a seat in the parliament, which he held until 1979.  In 1968 the People's Alliance officially became a political party. At that time Hannibal left and formed his own Union of Liberals and Leftists.

In the mid 1960s the U.S. States Department estimated the party membership to be approximately 1,000 (1% of the working age population of Iceland).

In 1998 it joined forces with the Social Democrat Party, the Women's Alliance (Samtök um kvennalista) and the National Awakening (Þjóðvaki) in forming the Social Democratic Alliance (Samfylkingin), a broad centre-left party. However the People's Alliance continues to exist on papers until its debts are paid.

The party was not a communist party, but it used to be the Icelandic referent of the World Communist Movement. It was opposed to NATO and the presence of U.S. military forces in Iceland. It was also opposed to Icelandic membership of the European Union and the EEA agreement in 1993 between the EFTA and the EU, Iceland being a member of EFTA.

Some members of the People's Alliance did not conciliate the forming of the Alliance, including some MPs of the party, and formed the Left-Green Movement (Vinstrihreyfingin - grænt framboð), a socialist-green party, in 1999. The first chairman of the People's Alliance was Ragnar Arnalds. The existent president of Iceland, Ólafur Ragnar Grímsson, was chairman of the party from 1987 to 1995 after joining it coming from Union of Liberals and Leftists after he broke away from the Progressive Party (Iceland).

It participated in 5 coalition governments from 1956 to 1991, beginning in Hermann Jónasson's last government 1956-1958, then in both of Ólafur Jóhannesson's governments 1in 1971-1974 and in 1978-1979, then in Gunnar Thoroddsen's only government 1980-1983 and finally in Steingrímur Hermannsson's latter government in 1988-1991.

The youth league of the People's Alliance was known as ÆFAB.

Election results

Chairpersons

Sources 
Hannes H. Gissurarson: Communism in Iceland, 1918–1998 Social Science Research Institute at the University of Iceland, Reykjavik 2021.

References 

Defunct political parties in Iceland
Social democratic parties
Socialist parties in Iceland
1956 establishments in Iceland
Political parties disestablished in 1998
Political parties established in 1956
Social Democratic Alliance
1998 disestablishments in Iceland